The Dutch Figure Skating Championships are a figure skating national championship held annually to determine the national champions of the Netherlands. Skaters compete in the disciplines of men's singles, ladies' singles, pair skating, and ice dancing. Skaters compete at the senior, junior (A), novice (B), and debs (C) levels.

Since 2017, the Dutch Championships have been combined with the  Challenge Cup.

Senior medalists

Men

Ladies

Pairs

Ice dancing

Synchronized skating

Junior medalists

Men

Ladies

Pairs

Advanced novice medalists

Boys

Girls

Basic novice medalists

Boys

Girls

References

External links
 Dutch Ice Skating Association (KNSB)

 
Figure skating in the Netherlands
Figure skating national championships